Sega World Sydney was an indoor high-tech amusement park that operated for almost four years, in Sydney. The theme park was built as the flagship tenant of the Darling Walk complex in Darling Harbour, and was designed and themed by gaming company Sega as one of several SegaWorld-branded amusement parks.

History 
Jacfun, in collaboration with Sega and the Darling Harbour Authority, acquired land for the park in 1994, and invested an estimated A$80 million to build Sega World Sydney, which opened in March 1997. Sega World Sydney utilized the latest in multimedia, entertainment and destination attraction events. It was described as "Australia's Interactive Disneyland" by the media. Many of the themes were based on various Sega franchises, primarily Sonic the Hedgehog. The park was also host to underage dance parties called Crush, usually held during school holidays. The remainder of the complex was sublet to a mix of retail and entertainment tenants, including the Daintree Cafe and the One World Sports restaurant and bar.

Due to a below-expected attendance and constant financial losses, the park was closed in November 2000. Hopes that the influx of tourists traveling to Sydney for the 2000 Summer Olympics would help the park meet its 800,000-visitor breakeven point went unrealized. Sega had sold its stake in the park to Jacfun in 1999, for A$36 million.
 
In March 2001, the contents of the park were auctioned off. Only 300 people attended the auction, with most of the rides sold off for minimal prices. The two major rides of the park, Rail Chase and Ghost Hunters, were sold to foreign buyers, with one of the rides going for A$60,000 less than its intended sale price of A$200,000. Some of the amusement park's interior fixtures were still in place as of 2008, covered by backdrops and boarding.

Rides

Though there was no unified theme in SegaWorld, much of its main allure was its pretences of offering "futuractive" rides with interactive elements. In reality, few of the attractions installed at the venue drew upon particularly advanced technology, however most did feature some interactive element.

As well as the rides, the park included a fast-food outlet and an extensive coin-op video arcade, featuring over 100 arcade games. All games in this area were set to Free Play at a point in early 2000, prior to the closure.

Sonic Live in Sydney
A 1½ hour live show hosted at the park, Sonic Live in Sydney, was set in an alternate timeline based around the Saturday morning  Sonic the Hedgehog animated series and served as a between-story for Sonic the Hedgehog 2 and Sonic the Hedgehog 3. During the show, Doctor Robotnik's Death Egg crash-lands in Australia instead of Angel Island and he attempts a hostile takeover of Sydney, which is foiled by Sonic, Tails, and Princess Sally Acorn. The show featured a large amount of audience interaction.

Most of the music (as well as sound effects) for the show was taken from Masato Nakamura's score on Sonic The Hedgehog 2, with three musical numbers: "What Are We Waiting For" sung by Sonic, "Give Me Chaos" sung by Dr. Robotnik, and "Thank You For Being You" sung by Sally. A studio-recorded version of the performance was released on CD at the park.

In 1998, one year after Sydney was first performed, the show was shut down due to lack of interest from Sega. It was quickly replaced with a puppetry-based remake that began performing from 1998 until the park's closure in 2000. Aside from a few still images taken by the show's staff, no footage of this incarnation has surfaced.

These two performances are notable for having two of the only times Sonic has had a female voice actor, another notable example being Sonic's Schoolhouse. This was also the first time Tails had a female English voice actor, which would become common practice starting with Shadow the Hedgehog.

As of 2022, no video of either version of the show has surfaced, and only the audio for the first incarnation is known to exist.

Other tenants and post-Sega World history

Shortly after Sega World closed, the two other major tenants of the Darling Walk complex, the Daintree Cafe and the One World Sports restaurant and bar, also closed. Jacfun planned to install an entertainment complex to replace Sega World, as the restrictions of the "entertainment use" zoning prevented Jacfun from exploring other options, such as replacing the building with offices. In March 2003, unable to find a new flagship tenant and losing money, Jacfun sold the lease for the Darling Walk site back to the Sydney Harbour Foreshore Authority for A$10 million, with the lease set to expire in June 2008. Around May 2006, the only tenant was a McDonald's restaurant, although the former Sega World site saw use as a furniture exhibition warehouse. From June 2006 to June 2007, the former One World Sports area was used as the house for MTV reality television series The Real World: Sydney.

In 2008, the SHFA leased the Darling Walk site to Lend Lease for A$560 million, which planned to demolish the building and erect two nine-storey office blocks for the Commonwealth Bank. This development was permitted by the changing of the zoning affecting the site, which had occurred shortly before the lease's signing. The old building demolished during October and November 2008. In March 2009, Jacfun initiated legal action in the New South Wales Supreme Court against the Sydney Harbour Foreshore Authority for "deceptive conduct" and claiming a share of the redevelopment's profits. A clause in the 2003 sale of Jacfun's lease back to the SHFA stated that if the Darling Walk site was resold within five years for more than A$40 million, a share of the profit would be forwarded to Jacfun; the rezoning of the site (which made the subsequent resale feasible) occurred just after the five-year period expired, and Jacfun was alleging that this had been planned prior to their lease ending. On 25 July 2012, the New South Wales Court of Appeal ordered the Sydney Harbour Foreshore Authority to pay $1.2 million for the loss of its Jacfun's opportunity to negotiate a higher price for the surrender of the lease.

In April 2018 it was discovered that a Sonic and Sally statue, a smaller version of the iconic statue that stood outside of the building, had turned up at a junkyard in Londonderry in Sydney's north west. The junkyard also houses two entryway signs from another former Sydney theme park in Wonderland.

References

External links
 Archived copy of the Sega World Sydney website 

Amusement parks in New South Wales
Buildings and structures demolished in 2008
Defunct amusement parks in Australia
1997 establishments in Australia
2000 disestablishments in Australia
Demolished buildings and structures in Sydney
Former buildings and structures in Sydney
Sega amusement parks
Sonic the Hedgehog
Amusement parks opened in 1997
Amusement parks closed in 2000